"Take Me As I Am" is a song by American singer Mary J. Blige It was written by Jordan Suecof and Thabiso Nkhereanye along with three members of the writing collective The Clutch, Ezekiel Lewis, Candice Nelson, and singer Keri Hilson, for her seventh studio album, The Breakthrough (2005). Production was helmed by Infinity and Ron Fair, with co-production from Tal Herzberg. The song samples "Garden of Peace" (1979) by American jazz musician Lonnie Liston Smith. Due to the inclusion of the sample, he is also credited as songwriter. Released as the album's fourth and final single, "Take Me As I Am" debuted on the US Hot R&B/Hip-Hop Songs chart in August 2006, reaching number three.

Music video
The music video for "Take Me as I Am" was directed by Bille Woodruff and filmed in July 2006. It uses an alternate version of the song that has a shorter instrumental intro, as well as a longer bridge after the second hook. "Take Me as I Am" premiered on  BET's countdown show 106 & Park in September 2006.

In the video, Blige portrays different women in different life situations except for her alter ego, Brook Lynn, who plays Date Mary. As the video begins, Blige is a waitress/dishwasher getting her children ready for school and also trying to get her boyfriend / husband a job. Next, Blige is an editor during a photo shoot, in which a photographer is photographing Blige as a model. "Model Mary" is replaced with another model due to a tabloid report of a breakdown. "Editor Mary" is then sexually harassed by a corporate and walks out; while "model Mary" overdoses drugs in the bathroom of the photo shoot set, shortly after being replaced. In the restaurant which "Waitress Mary" works, Blige plays another character as well. This one is simply the girlfriend of a controlling boyfriend and is at lunch with her date. The date (Lance Gross) refuses to allow Blige to eat the appetizer bread, takes her menu from her and orders her a salad, clearly trying to personally control her weight. The date then gets up and appears to be flirting with a young woman in a pink dress. "Date Mary" (portrayed by Blige's alter ego, Brook Lynn) is checking her makeup and sees her date in the mirror reflection, then gets up and throws a glass of water in their faces, then leaves. Waitress Mary returns home after accidentally dropping food at work and kicks her lazy boyfriend out.

Credits and personnel 
Credits adapted from The Breakthrough liner notes.

Mary J. Blige – vocal producer, vocals
Mike Eleopolous – assistant engineer
Ron Fair – conductor, producer, vocal producer
Tal Herzberg – co-producer, engineer
Keri Hilson – writer 
Lonnie Liston Smith – writer (sample)
Ezekiel Lewis – writer 
Jaycen Joshua – mixing assistant
Candice Nelson – writer 
Thabiso Nkhereanye – writer 
Dave Pensado – mixing
Allen Sides – recording
Jordan "Infinity" Suecof – producer, writer

Charts

Weekly charts

Year-end charts

References

2006 singles
Mary J. Blige songs
Music videos directed by Bille Woodruff
Songs written by Keri Hilson
Songs written by Ron Fair
Geffen Records singles
Song recordings produced by Ron Fair
2005 songs
Songs written by Ezekiel Lewis
Songs written by Candice Nelson (songwriter)
Songs written by Infinity (producer)
2000s ballads
Contemporary R&B ballads
Soul ballads